Disarmonia Mundi is a melodic death metal band from Avigliana, Italy, that started out as a progressive death metal band. The project is the brainchild of the producer and multi-instrumentalist Ettore Rigotti and is mainly known for featuring Soilwork's vocalist Björn "Speed" Strid as guest vocalist on several albums. After releasing two albums under Scarlet Records, they have signed to Italy-based Coroner Records.

History

Early years and Nebularium
Disarmonia Mundi was founded by Ettore Rigotti in 1999. The band would initially go through several line-up changes but would successfully record their debut album, Nebularium. The album was completely self-produced by Ettore in his home studio. The response to the album allowed the band to sign a contract with Self for Italian distribution and with Cd-Maximum for distribution in Russia. Line-up problems would prevent live performances to support Nebularium and in turn would slow down the process of recording the forthcoming album.

New members, label and Fragments of D-Generation
The only people remaining from the former line-up, Ettore Rigotti and Mirco Andreis, would be joined by newcomer Claudio Ravinale. The resulting promo would help Disarmonia Mundi attain a recording contract with Scarlet Records.

Ettore got in contact with Soilwork front man Björn "Speed" Strid. What started out as a "guest appearance" on a track for the forthcoming album, Fragments of D-Generation would turn into Strid performing as guest vocalist for most of the songs featured on the album. The release of Fragments of D-Generation would generate several positive feedback.  While Strid would go back to working on Soilwork's Stabbing the Drama, Ettore and Claudio would begin composing the music and lyrics for their third album.

Mind Tricks
While Ettore and Claudio worked on the new record, Mirco decided to leave the band to concentrate on other interests. The remaining members tracked most of the new album in three weeks. The band remained a duo for the recording of Mind Tricks while having Strid guesting again on vocals, splitting them equally between Claudio with Ettore contributing clean vocals as well. During the recording, ex-member Mirco shot a video for the band's single "Celestial Furnace".

The Isolation Game
The new album entitled, The Isolation Game, was released December 9, 2009. Strid recorded guest vocals on a few songs while the majority of the scream and growl vocals being handled by Claudio, guitarist Olof Mörck of Nightrage performed a guest solo on one song.

On 12 November 2008 the band released new information on their MySpace: "We have finished the pre-production of our forthcoming fourth album entitled "The Isolation Game" scheduled for an early spring release. News about the label for this album will be revealed very soon."  The label would later be revealed as Coroner Records; a new record label based out of Italy.  The recordings took place at Ettore Rigotti's "The Metal House" studios in Italy. Björn "Speed" Strid (Soilwork, Terror 2000) recorded vocals for "a few songs" on The Isolation Game. Much like MindTricks, The Isolation Game features more singing from Ettore and Claudio. Upon its release, The Isolation Game received positive, if lukewarm reviews, with one critic commenting "however great an example of Swedish-style melodic death metal this is, it doesn’t do anything that we haven’t heard before".

Prior to the release of The Isolation Game, Disarmonia Mundi released a remastered edition of their debut album, Nebularium, in double disc packaging, with the second disc containing six songs that were b-sides to album recording sessions. The second disc is called The Restless Memoirs EP. The re-release package was put out by Coroner Records on 26 June 2009.

The forming of The Stranded 
On 10 November 2011, Ettore and Claudio announced on the Myspace page of Disarmonia Mundi that they had formed a new band with NeroArgento and the American professional skateboarder Elliot Sloan, called The Stranded. On 2 July 2012 the band released the album Survivalism Boulevard on Coroner Records, the album has been met with a general positive feedback.

The band began writing for their fifth album in September 2012. On February 5, 2015, the band announced on their official Facebook page that they are currently mastering the album which is still untitled.

Cold Inferno 
Following the March 16, 2015, announcement, the band's next album, Cold Inferno, got released on June 9, 2015. As for The Isolation Game, Cold Inferno featured the majority of vocals handled by Claudio with Ettore providing clean vocals and Speed guesting on a couple of tracks, while all the instrumental parts have been tracked and produced by Ettore at The Metal House studio as usual.

According to an interview with Ettore Rigotti, the next album will be released within less than two years. An Instagram post, dated 11th of January 2020, implied the release date would be sometime within the year, but did not specify.

5 Star Grave and The Silverblack
Besides providing vocals for Disarmonia Mundi, Claudio has been active since 2005 with the horror metal band 5 Star Grave releasing three albums so far: Corpse Breed Syndrome (self-produced, 2008), Drugstore Hell (Massacre Records, 2012), Drugstore Hell (Sliptrick Records, 2017).

In late 2013 Claudio and longtime friend, producer and multi-instrumentalist NeroArgento started working on a new industrial metal project called The Silverblack releasing the self-titled debut album in 2014 via AExeron Media / FiXT divided into five monthly episodes of two songs each. The second album entitled The Grand Turmoil has been released by Sliptrick Records in autumn 2015 while in 2018 the band completed the production of their third full-length album entitled Rain On A Wedding Day that has been released via DarkTunes Music Group the 30th of November 2018. The Silverblack released their fourth album Prototype 6:17 November 21st 2019.

Infernalizer
October 31st 2020 sees the unveiling of another project by Claudio called Infernalizer (a nickname he's also been using referring to himself in the last The Silverblack records): the new band is more horror-metal oriented and deeply rooted in 80s metal sound. A video is released for the song "Leaving So Soon?" (with Claudio showcasing a heavy monster-like horror make-up) while the band is still busy putting the finishing touches on the full-length album entitled "The Ugly Truth" scheduled for a late 2020/early 2021 release by Rockshots Records.

Band members

Current members
 Ettore Rigotti − guitars, drums, keyboards, clean vocals (1999-present) bass (2005-present)
 Claudio Ravinale − unclean vocals, lyrics (2004-present)

Session members
 Björn "Speed" Strid − vocals

Former members
 Mirco Andreis − bass guitar (1999-2005)
 Benny Bianco Chinto − vocals, lyrics (1999-2002)
 Simone Palermiti − guitar, songwriting (1999-2002)
 Federico Cagliero  − guitar, songwriting (2001)

Timeline

Discography

Studio albums
 Nebularium (2001)
 Fragments of D-Generation (2004)
 Mind Tricks (2006)
 The Isolation Game (2009)
 Cold Inferno (2015)

Miscellaneous
 Nebularium + The Restless Memoirs (EP, 2009)
 "Perdition Haze" (single, 2009)
 Princess Ghibli (split, 2011)
 Princess Ghibli 2 (split, 2012)
 Love (Feelingless) (feature, 2022)

Videography
 "Red Clouds" from Fragments of D-Generation
 "Celestial Furnace" from Mind Tricks

References

External links
 Official Disarmonia Mundi website

Italian melodic death metal musical groups
Musical groups established in 2000
Italian musical duos
Scarlet Records artists